St. John's Sports Club is a Grenadian football club from Gouyave, Saint John Parish that plays in the Grenada Premier Division.

Squad

References

External links

St Johns